In economics and finance, market manipulation is a type of market abuse where there is a deliberate attempt to interfere with the free and fair operation of the market; the most blatant of cases involve creating false or misleading appearances with respect to the price of, or market for, a product, security or commodity. 

Market manipulation is prohibited in most countries, in particular, it is prohibited in the United States under Section 9(a)(2) of the Securities Exchange Act of 1934, in the European Union under Article 12 of the Market Abuse Regulation, in Australia under Section 1041A of the Corporations Act 2001, and in Israel under Section 54(a) of the securities act of 1968. In the US, market manipulation is also prohibited for wholesale electricity markets under Section 222 of the Federal Power Act and wholesale natural gas markets under Section 4A of the Natural Gas Act.

The US Securities Exchange Act defines market manipulation as "transactions which create an artificial price or maintain an artificial price for a tradable security".

Examples

Rampproofing 
To filter out or disregard false and misleading social media posts that were posted for the sole purpose of artificially inflating the market valuation of listed securities.

Pools
Agreements, often written, among a group of traders to delegate authority to a single manager to trade in a specific stock for a work period of time and then to share in the resulting profits or losses. In Australia section 1041B prohibits pooling.

Churning
When an advisor enters into a trade for the sole purpose of earning commission. For example buying and selling the same stock either on the same day or over multiple days with no consideration for the benefit of the client

Stock bashing
This scheme is usually orchestrated by savvy online message board posters (a.k.a. "Bashers") who make up false and/or misleading information about the target company in an attempt to get shares for a cheaper price. This activity, in most cases, is conducted by posting libelous posts on multiple public forums. The perpetrators sometimes work directly for unscrupulous Investor Relations firms who have convertible notes that convert for more shares the lower the bid or ask price is; thus the lower these Bashers can drive a stock price down by trying to convince shareholders they have bought a worthless security, the more shares the Investor Relations firm receives as compensation. Immediately after the stock conversion is complete and shares are issued to the Investor Relations firm, consultant, attorney or similar party, the basher/s then become friends of the company and move quickly to ensure they profit on a classic Pump & Dump scheme to liquidate their ill-gotten shares. (See pump and dump.)

Pump and dump
A pump and dump scheme is generally part of a more complex grand plan of market manipulation on the targeted security. The perpetrators (usually stock promoters) convince company affiliates and large position non-affiliates to release shares into a free trading status as "Payment" for services for promoting the security. Instead of putting out legitimate information about a company the promoter sends out bogus e-mails (the "Pump") to millions of unsophisticated investors (Sometimes called "Retail Investors") in an attempt to drive the price of the stock and volume to higher points. When the stock price and volume has reached a target level the promoter sells their shares (the "Dump") at the now elevated prices, taking money off the duped investors who are left holding a stock whose price subsequently falls.

Runs
When a group of traders create activity or rumours in order to drive the price of a security up.  An example is the Guinness share-trading fraud of the 1980's.  In the US, this activity is usually referred to as painting the tape. Runs may also occur when trader(s) are attempting to drive the price of a certain share down, although this is rare. (see Stock Bashing)

Ramping (the market)
Actions designed to artificially raise the market price of listed securities and give the impression of voluminous trading in order to make a quick profit.

Wash trade
In a wash trade the manipulator takes both the buy and the sell side of a trade, often using a third party as a proxy to trade on behalf of the manipulator, for the purpose of generating activity and increasing the price. This is more involved than churning because the orders are actually fulfilled.

Bear raid
In a bear raid there is an attempt to push the price of a stock down by heavy selling or short selling.

Lure and squeeze
This works with a company that is very distressed on paper, with impossibly high debt, consistently high annual losses but very few assets, making it look as if bankruptcy must be imminent.  The stock price gradually falls as people new to the stock short it on the basis of the poor outlook for the company, until the number of shorted shares greatly exceeds the total number of shares that are not held by those aware of the lure and squeeze scheme (henceforward "people in the know").  In the meantime, people in the know increasingly purchase the stock as it drops to lower and lower prices.  When the short interest has reached a maximum, the company announces it has made a deal with its creditors to settle its loans in exchange for shares of stock (or some similar kind of arrangement that leverages the stock price to benefit the company), knowing that those who have short positions will be squeezed as the price of the stock sky-rockets.  Near its peak price, people in the know start to sell, and the price gradually falls back down again for the cycle to repeat.

Quote stuffing
Quote stuffing is made possible by high-frequency trading programs that can execute market actions with incredible speed. However, high-frequency trading in and of itself is not illegal. The tactic involves using specialized, high-bandwidth hardware to quickly enter and withdraw large quantities of orders in an attempt to flood the market, thereby gaining an advantage over slower market participants.

Cross-market manipulation
Cross-market manipulation occurs when a trader trades in one market for the purpose of manipulating the price of an asset in another market, capitalizing off the price-moving effects thus generated, instead of with the bona fide intent of profiting off the trade itself.

Cross-product manipulation
A type of manipulation possible when financial instruments are settled based on benchmarks set by the trading of physical commodities, for example in United States Natural Gas Markets. The manipulator takes a large long (short) financial position that will benefit from the benchmark settling at a higher (lower) price, then trades in the physical commodity markets at such a large volume as to influence the benchmark price in the direction that will benefit their financial position.

Spoofing (finance)
Spoofing is a disruptive algorithmic trading entity employed by traders to outpace other market participants and to manipulate commodity markets. Spoofers feign interest in trading futures, stocks and other products in financial markets creating an illusion of exchange pessimism in the futures market when many offers are being cancelled or withdrawn, or false optimism or demand when many offers are being placed in bad faith. Spoofers bid or offer with intent to cancel before the orders are filled. The flurry of activity around the buy or sell orders is intended to attract other high-frequency traders (HFT) to induce a particular market reaction such as manipulating the market price of a security. Spoofing can be a factor in the rise and fall of the price of shares and can be very profitable to the spoofer who can time buying and selling based on this manipulation.

Price-fixing 
A very simple type of fraud where the principals who publish a price or indicator conspire to set it falsely and benefit their own interests. The Libor scandal for example, involved bankers setting the Libor rate to benefit their trader's portfolios or to make certain entities appear more creditworthy than they were.

High closing (finance)
High closing is an attempt to manipulate the price of a security at the end of trading day to ensure that it closes higher than it should.  This is usually achieved by putting in manipulative trades close to closing.

Cornering the market
In cornering the market the manipulators buy sufficiently large amount of an asset, often a commodity, so they can control the price creating in effect a monopoly. For example, the brothers Nelson Bunker Hunt and William Herbert Hunt attempted to corner the world silver markets in the late 1970s and early 1980s, at one stage holding the rights to more than half of the world's deliverable silver. During the Hunts' accumulation of the precious metal, silver prices rose from $11 an ounce in September 1979 to nearly $50 an ounce in January 1980. Silver prices ultimately collapsed to below $11 an ounce two months later, much of the fall occurring on a single day now known as Silver Thursday, due to changes made to exchange rules regarding the purchase of commodities on margin.

See also
 1992 Indian stock market scam
 Harshad Mehta 
 Ketan Parekh scam  
 NSE co-location scam  
 Adani Group scam

References
 

Commercial crimes 
Corporate crime 
Cover-ups 
Financial markets
Financial crimes
Finance fraud 
Organized crime
Stock market crashes